G. David Schine in Hell is a one-act play written by Tony Kushner. It was first published in the New York Times Magazine in 1996 under the title "A Backstage Pass to Hell". It was published as a part of the Kushner anthology Death and Taxes: Hydriotaphia and Other Plays in 2000 by the Theatre Communications Group.

Plot
The play centers on G. David Schine, who arrives in Hell, described as resembling a "dinner theater in Orange County California", and is re-united with Roy Cohn, Richard Nixon, Whittaker Chambers, and J. Edgar Hoover. Many of the characters are dressed in drag—Hoover, for example, is wearing a "black Chanel dress, hose and stiletto pumps"—and Nixon bemoans the "gender confusion" rampant in hell.

Background
Kushner writes in the introduction of Death and Taxes that G. David Schine in Hell was written as a "year-end roundup of deceased notable Americans", and that Times’s policy required him to edit out "much of the profanity in the piece". Although it is not attributed, the play may have been inspired in part by a National Lampoon cartoon feature entitled "Roy Cohn in Hell", which depicts Cohn joining Hoover and Senator Joseph R. McCarthy in the nether regions.

The play is noted for its similarity with Kushner's 1993 hit Angels in America: A Gay Fantasia on National Themes due to the appearance of Roy Cohn, the characteristic "mixture of history, fantasy, and outrageous humor", and the "depiction of the traditional battles between the twentieth century's conservative and liberal political poles".

References

External links
 G. David Schine in Hell, The New York Times Magazine (December 29, 1996)

Plays by Tony Kushner
Plays set in hell
1996 plays